The 1989 FA Vase Final was contested by Sudbury Town and Tamworth at Wembley in London in front of a record 26,487 crowd for an FA Vase Final. The original match, played on 6 May 1989, finished 1–1. Tamworth won the replay at London Road in Peterborough on 10 May, 3–0.

Route to the final

The FA Vase is an annual football competition for teams playing below Step 4 of the English National League System.

Tamworth

Tamworth began their cup run with a home tie against Southern Football League Midland Division rivals Bridgnorth Town. They won the game 2-1 with goals coming from Mark Stanton and Russell Gordon. Former Tottenham Hotspur, Stoke City and Bolton Wanderers striker, Ian Moores, joined the club in February and made his Vase debut in the semi-final against North Ferriby United. Captain Andy Foote snapped his hamstring on the Thursday before the final and was replaced by Steve Cartwright.

Sudbury Town

Under a new management team of Don James and Martin Head, Sudbury Town had reached the semi-finals of the Vase in the previous year. Against a difficult set of opponents on their route to the final in the 1988-89 season, they only conceded one goal, a penalty scored by March Town in the third round. In the fourth round game, away against Beazer Homes League Southern League Hounslow, Mick Money was sent off after an hour but Sudbury held on for a 1-0 win. In the fifth round, they beat Rossendale United who in the fourth round had beaten last year's finalists, Emley, who in turn had knocked out the previous year's winners, Colne Dynamoes. A record home crowd of 4,320 saw a 6-0 victory over Hungerford Town in the second leg of the semi-final to see the team reach Wembley.

Match details

Summary
In the final at Wembley, Dave Hubbick opened the scoring for Sudbury with a header after 6 minutes, following a cross by Bryan Klug. In the thirteenth minute, Klug had a corner cleared off the goal-line and Dean Barker's follow up shot was blocked. Marlin Devaney equalised for Tamworth after half-time. Martin Myers on the right-hand side for Tamworth was effective and led Sudbury to make a double substitution. The game went to extra-time and when the whistle was blown after the first 15 minutes of extra-time, Mike Henry threw a punch at Russell Gordon and, although the referee did not see it, the linesman ran on to the pitch and Henry was sent off. Sudbury's man of the match, according to the East Anglian Daily Times, was Hubbick. The players climbed the steps of Wembley to be presented to chief guest Pat Jennings.

Replay

References

FA Vase Finals
Fa Vase Final 1989
Fa Vase Final 1989
Fa Vase Final 1989